GGC may refer to:

 Cargo 360, a defunct American cargo airline
 Gandhara grave culture
 Gangapur City railway station, in Rajasthan, India
 Gemini Guidance Computer, used in NASA's Project Gemini
 Georgia Gulf Corporation, now Axiall, an American chemical company
 Georgia Gwinnett College, in Lawrenceville, Georgia, United States
 Gibson Guitar Corporation, an American guitar manufacturer
 Girl Guides of Canada
 GGC, a codon for the amino acid glycine
 Gotland Game Conference
 Governor General of Canada
 Grand and General Council, of San Marino
 Lumbala Airport, in Angola
 NHS Greater Glasgow and Clyde, a health board in Scotland